The Bristol Feeder Canal is a body of water in Bristol, England, that connects the Floating Harbour with the River Avon.

It stretches from Netham Lock where it connects with the tidal Avon in the east, to Totterdown Basin where it connects to the Floating Harbour and the original course of the Avon in the west.

Map of Bristol Harbour (with Feeder Canal between numbers 12 and 13)

References

Canals in England
Geography of Bristol
Bristol Harbourside